KLD may refer to:

Transport 
 Kildale railway station, England (station code)
 Klender railway station, Indonesia (station code)

Others 
 Gamilaraay language, ISO 639-3 language code
 High Council of Justice (Këshilli i Lartë i Drejtësisë), former council in Albania
 Kernel Loadable Module, the FreeBSD term for loadable kernel module
Ministry of Climate and Environment (Klima- og miljødepartementet), ministry in Norway
 Kongres Liberalno-Demokratyczny, Polish political party
 Kullback–Leibler divergence, a measure between probability distributions